Penzance TMD, also known as Long Rock TMD, is a railway traction maintenance depot situated in the village of Long Rock east of Penzance, Cornwall, England, and is the most westerly and southerly rail depot in the country. The depot operator is Great Western Railway. The depot code is PZ.

Description

The depot is beside the Cornish Main Line, where it runs as a single track on the southern side and terminates at Penzance railway station, half a mile west of the depot.

The depot is small, with six long sidings to store High Speed Trains and Voyagers, and four smaller sidings. If the longer sidings are all used up, trains are stored at Laira TMD, Plymouth, and then make their way to Penzance railway station in the morning. The depot also has a fuel lane, a single-tracked modern maintenance shed, and a small carriage washer. A few years ago, facilities at Penzance TMD were expanded to cater for the new fleet of Voyagers used by CrossCountry.

The main line and depot lie near the sea, with just Long Rock beach and the embankment that carries the South West Coast Path separating them, which means this depot and the main line sometimes have problems due to the sea.

The fuel storage tanks at the depot are located behind the maintenance shed and are replenished on a daily basis by road deliveries.

History

Steam shed 
A four-road engine shed was built at Long Rock in 1914. As well as the engine shed there was a turntable built to fit all size locomotives which ran on the route. The depot had watering facilities and coal stored for the locomotives, as well as sidings around the depot. The turntable was removed in 1966 and two of the four shed roads were removed in 1968.

From 1958 Long Rock serviced diesel locomotives, which continued after steam traction had ended in 1962. The steam depot was closed in June 1976.

Diesel shed 

A new depot was constructed on the same site as the steam shed, designed for British Rail's fleet of new Intercity 125 fleet (now referred to as High Speed Trains or HSTs). The depot consisted of a 750 ft long maintenance shed, long enough to fit a full IC125 set, along with a fueling lane on the southern side of the shed. Six long sidings were built to the east of the maintenance shed for stabling IC125's when not in use, which also have overhead gantry lights. The mainline next to the depot was also singled at the same time. In total the new depot cost £1.5 million to build, and was ready for use in October 1977.

Capacity at the depot was increased in a project that started in 2017 to cater for additional rolling stock maintenance such as additional cars for the Night Riviera sleeper service. The work cost £20m. On 13 April 2019, after the work was completed, an open day was held at the depot in aid of Penlee Lifeboat station and the RNLI.

Trains serviced

Allocated to the depot:
  - 08645 'St. Piran' is the depot shunter.
  and the Mark 3 coaches for the Night Riviera overnight service to London.
The following visit the depot but are based elsewhere:
 Class 150 and 158 Sprinters for local and branch services.
  diesel/electric bi-mode units for services to London Paddington.

References

 Rail Atlas Great Britain & Ireland, S.K. Baker 
 An illustrated history of the Cornish Main Line, John Vaughan, 2009, 

Rail transport in Cornwall
Railway depots in England
Buildings and structures in Penzance